The Earliest Show is an American comedy web series starring Ben Schwartz and Lauren Lapkus. Produced by Funny or Die, the series was sponsored by Cap'n Crunch cereal as a form of branded content. It follows morning show co-hosts Josh Bath and Sam Newman who must deal with the aftermath of Josh's failed on-air wedding proposal. The show is largely improvised. The Earliest Show premiered on October 27, 2016 and consisted of six episodes.

Synopsis 
Josh Bath (Ben Schwartz) and Sam Newman (Lauren Lapkus) are co-hosts of The Earliest Show, which broadcasts at 3:00AM. Josh surprises his girlfriend (Jessica Meraz) with an on-air proposal and begins to unravel emotionally after she rejects him. Each episode follows Josh going through a different stage of grief on-air.

Cast 
 Lauren Lapkus as Samantha Newman, co-host
 Ben Schwartz as Josh Bath, co-host
 Jessica Meraz as Emily Fernandez, Josh's ex-girlfriend
 Joe Hartzler as Marc the producer
Eugene Cordero as Chef Tommy
Betsy Sodaro as Katie Veal
Ryan Stanger performs the in-show commercials for fake products

Guest starring
Jake Johnson, Thomas Middleditch, Reggie Watts, Reggie Miller, Pedro Pascal, and Jane Levy as themselves

Production

Development 
Cap'n Crunch had previously worked with Funny or Die and approached Schwartz with an idea for a series meant to target a young demographic. He pitched a parody of a morning show based around a co-host whose rejection proposal causes him to spiral. Schwartz also served as the series' director and recruited former Asssscat improv team member Lapkus as his co-host. Schwartz studied Today and Live with Kelly to get a sense of morning talk show format, camera work, and set design. Each episode consisted largely of improvisation. An additional episode of over an hour of improvised bloopers was released as episode seven of the series.

Release 
The Earliest Show premiered on Funny Or Die on October 27, 2016, and one episode was released each Tuesday thereafter. The episodes were also released on YouTube. Each episode runs for 11 to 13 minutes. Two additional episodes, one of bloopers and one with extended interviews, were also released.

Accolades 
Schwartz and Lapkus received 2017 Primetime Creative Arts Emmy Awards nominations for acting in the Short Form Comedy or Drama Series category.

References

External links 
The Earliest Show on IMDB
The Earliest Show on Funny or Die

Funny or Die
2016 web series debuts
American comedy web series
Improvisational television series